Morrisson (born 1990) is a British rapper. Several of his singles charted on the UK Singles Chart in 2020–21, while also reaching the top 40 of the UK R&B Singles Chart. His 2021 UK garage single, "House & Garage", reached No. 46 and features rapper Aitch. Morrisson has also collaborated with Steel Banglez, Tion Wayne, Loski, Jordan, Headie One, Bugzy Malone, Kelly Kiara, Harry James, Krept & Konan, M1llionz and Sidhu Moose Wala.

In November 2020, Morrisson was involved in a fight between Tion Wayne and Headie One on an Emirates flight, in which he tried to break up the altercation.

Discography

Extended plays

Singles

References

External links
 Guilty EP review on GRM Daily
 Morrisson's channel on YouTube

1990 births
21st-century British rappers
English male rappers
Rappers from London
Gangsta rappers
People from the London Borough of Newham
Living people
RCA Records artists